The 1st Moscow International Film Festival was held from 3 to 17 August 1959. The Grand Prix was awarded to the Soviet film Destiny of a Man directed by Sergei Bondarchuk.

Jury
 Sergei Gerasimov (USSR - President of the Jury)
 Antonin Brousil (Czechoslovakia)
 Emma Väänänen (Finland)
 Thorold Dickinson (Great Britain)
 Christian-Jaque (France)
 Kálmán Nádasdy (Hungary)
 Hans Rodenberg (East Germany)
 Bimal Roy (India)
 Henri Storck (Belgium)
 Jerzy Toeplitz (Poland)
 Kiyohiko Ushihara (Japan)
 Zhang Junxiang (China)
 Sergei Yutkevich (USSR)

Films in competition
The following films were selected for the main competition:

Awards
 Grand Prix: Destiny of a Man by Sergei Bondarchuk
 Golden Medals:
 Aren't We Wonderful? by Kurt Hoffmann
 The Day Shall Dawn by A. J. Kardar
 Escape from the Shadows by Jiří Sequens
 Silver Medals:
 Actors: Wieńczysław Gliński, Bronisław Pawlik and Aleksander Sewruk for The Eagle
 Actress: Pureviin Tsevelsuren for Messenger of the People
 Director of Photography: Un Thak for Legend of Chunhyang
 Composer: Ustad Vilayat Khan for Jalsaghar
 Director: Lewis Gilbert for A Cry from the Streets
 Diplomas:
 Koji Shima for Unforgettable Trail
 Jean Valère for The Verdict

References

External links
Moscow International Film Festival: 1959 at Internet Movie Database

1959
1959 film festivals
1959 in Moscow